A land-grant university (also called land-grant college or land-grant institution) is an institution of higher education in the United States designated by a state to receive the benefits of the Morrill Acts of 1862 and 1890.

Signed by Abraham Lincoln in 1862, the first Morrill Act began to fund educational institutions by granting federally controlled land to the states for them to sell, to raise funds, to establish and endow "land-grant" colleges. The mission of these institutions as set forth in the 1862 act is to focus on the teaching of practical agriculture, science, military science, and engineering—although "without excluding other scientific and classical studies"—as a response to the industrial revolution and changing social class. This mission was in contrast to the historic practice of higher education concentrating on a liberal arts curriculum. A 1994 expansion gave land-grant status to several tribal colleges and universities.

Ultimately, most land-grant colleges became large public universities that today offer a full spectrum of educational opportunities. However, some land-grant colleges are private, including Cornell University, the Massachusetts Institute of Technology (MIT), and Tuskegee University.

History

The concept of publicly funded agricultural and technical educational institutions first rose to national attention through the efforts of Jonathan Baldwin Turner in the late 1840s. The first land-grant bill was introduced in Congress by Representative Justin Smith Morrill of Vermont in 1857. The bill passed in 1859, but was vetoed by President James Buchanan. Morrill resubmitted his bill in 1861, and President Abraham Lincoln signed the Morrill Act into law in 1862. The law gave every state and territory 30,000 acres per member of Congress to be used in establishing a "land grant" university. Over 17 million acres were granted through the federal land-grant law. Recent scholarship has emphasized that many of these federal public lands had been taken from Indigenous peoples through treaties and land cessions, often coerced through violence and threats.

Upon passage of the federal land-grant law in 1862, Iowa was the first state legislature to accept the provisions of the Morrill Act, on September 11, 1862. Iowa subsequently designated the State Agricultural College (now Iowa State University) as the land-grant college on March 29, 1864. The first land-grant institution actually created under the Act was Kansas State University, which was established on February 16, 1863, and opened on September 2, 1863. The oldest school that currently holds land-grant status is Rutgers University, founded in 1766 and designated the land-grant college of New Jersey in 1864. The oldest school to ever hold land-grant status was Yale University (founded in 1701), which was named Connecticut's land-grant recipient in 1863. This designation was later stripped by the Connecticut legislature in 1893 under populist pressure and transferred to what would become the University of Connecticut.

A second Morrill Act was passed in 1890, aimed at the former Confederate states. This act required each state to show that race was not an admissions criterion, or else to designate a separate land-grant institution for persons of color. This latter clause had the effect of facilitating segregated education, although it also provided higher educational opportunities for persons of color who otherwise would not have had them. Among the seventy colleges and universities which eventually evolved from the Morrill Acts are several of today's historically black colleges and universities. Though the 1890 Act granted cash instead of land, it granted colleges under that act the same legal standing as the 1862 Act colleges; hence the term "land-grant college" properly applies to both groups.

Later on, other colleges such as the University of the District of Columbia and the "1994 land-grant colleges" for Native Americans were also awarded cash by Congress in lieu of land to achieve "land-grant" status.

In imitation of the land-grant colleges' focus on agricultural and mechanical research, Congress later established programs of sea grant colleges (aquatic research, in 1966), space grant colleges (space research, in 1988), and sun grant colleges (sustainable energy research, in 2003).

West Virginia State University, a historically black university, is the only current land-grant university to have lost land-grant status (when desegregation cost it its state funding in 1957) and then subsequently regained it, which happened in 2001.

The land-grant college system has been seen as a major contributor in the faster growth rate of the U.S. economy that led to its overtaking the United Kingdom as economic superpower, according to research by faculty from the State University of New York.

The three-part mission of the land-grant university continues to evolve in the twenty-first century. What originally was described as "teaching, research, and service" was renamed "learning, discovery, and engagement" by the Kellogg Commission on the Future of State and Land-Grant Universities, and again recast as "talent, innovation, and place" by the Association of Public and Land-grant Universities (APLU).

State law precedents

Prior to the enactment of the Morrill Act in 1862, individual states established institutions of higher education with grants of land. The first state to do so was Georgia, which set aside 40,000 acres for higher education in 1784 and incorporated the University of Georgia in 1785.

The Farmers' High School of Pennsylvania (later to become The Pennsylvania State University) followed as a state agricultural land-grant school on February 22 of that year. Michigan State and Penn State were subsequently designated as the federal land-grant colleges for their states in 1863. In 1955, the U.S. Postal service issued a commemorative stamp to celebrate the two institutions as "first of the land-grant type institutions to be founded."

Hatch Act and Smith–Lever Act
The mission of the land-grant universities was expanded by the Hatch Act of 1887, which provided federal funds to states to establish a series of agricultural experiment stations under the direction of each state's land-grant college, as well as pass along new information, especially in the areas of soil minerals and plant growth. The outreach mission was further expanded by the Smith–Lever Act of 1914 to include cooperative extension—the sending of agents into rural areas to help bring the results of agricultural research to the end users. Beyond the original land grants, each land-grant college receives annual federal appropriations for research and extension work on the condition that those funds are matched by state funds.

Expansion
While today's land-grant universities were initially known as land-grant colleges, only a few of the more than 70 institutions that developed from the Morrill Acts retain "College" in their official names; most are universities.

The University of the District of Columbia received land-grant status in 1967 and a $7.24 million endowment (USD) in lieu of a land grant. In a 1972 Special Education Amendment, American Samoa, Guam, Micronesia, Northern Marianas, and the Virgin Islands each received $3 million.

In 1994, 29 tribal colleges and universities became land-grant institutions under the Improving America's Schools Act of 1994. As of 2008, 32 tribal colleges and universities have land-grant status in the U.S. Most of these colleges grant two-year degrees. Six are four-year institutions, and two offer a master's degree.

Land acknowledgment statements and criticism
In the early 21st century, a growing number of land-grant universities have placed land acknowledgment statements on their websites in recognition of the fact that their institutions occupy lands that were once traditional territories of Native American peoples. For example, the University of Illinois System states, 
These lands were the traditional birthright of indigenous peoples who were forcibly removed and who have faced two centuries of struggle for survival and identity in the wake of dispossession. We hereby acknowledge the ground on which we stand so that all who come here know that we recognize our responsibilities to the peoples of that land and that we strive to address that history so that it guides our work in the present and the future.  
Another example comes from the University of Nebraska-Lincoln which states, 
The University of Nebraska is a public, land-grant institution with campuses and programs across the State that reside on the past, present, and future homelands of the Pawnee, Ponca, Oto-Missouria, Omaha, Dakota, Lakota, Arapaho, Cheyenne, and Kaw Peoples, as well as the relocated Ho Chunk (Winnebago), Iowa, and Sac and Fox Peoples. 

In an article in High Country News, Robert Lee and Tristan Ahtone criticized such statements for failing to acknowledge the true breadth of the benefits derived by European Americans from formerly Native American land. They pointed out that land grants were used not only for campus sites but also included many other parcels that universities rented or sold to generate funds that formed the basis of their endowments. Lee and Ahtone also pointed out that only a few land-grant universities have undertaken significant efforts at reconciliation with respect to the latter types of parcels. For instance, they could identify what portions of their current resources are traceable to Native American lands and reallocate some of those resources to help Native Americans.

Nomenclature

Land-grant universities are not to be confused with sea grant colleges (a program instituted in 1966), space grant colleges (instituted in 1988), or sun grant colleges (instituted in 2003). In some states, the land-grant missions for agricultural research and extension have been relegated to a statewide agency of the university system rather than the original land-grant campus; an example is the Texas A&M University System. Its agricultural missions, including the agricultural college at the system's main campus, are now under the umbrella of Texas A&M AgriLife.

Relevant legislation

The Morrill Act of 1862
The Hatch Act of 1887
The second Morrill Act of 1890
The Adams Act – 1906
The Nelson Act – 1907
The Smith–Lever Act of 1914
Chapter 79 – May 8, 1914
The Smith–Hughes Act – 1917
The Parnell Act – 1925
The Capper–Ketcham Act – 1928
The Bankhead–Jones Act of 1935
The Bankhead–Flanagan Act – 1945
The Research Marketing Act – 1946
Amendment to Smith–Lever Act – 1953, 1955, 1961, 1962, 1968
Amended Hatch Act – 1955
The McIntire–Stennis Act – 1962
The Research Facilities Act – 1965
Public Law 89-106 – 1965
The National Sea Grant College Program – 1966
The Rural Development Act – 1972
The Food and Agriculture Act of 1977
The National Agricultural Research, Extension, and Teaching Policy Act of 1977 – Title XIV
The Resource Extension Act – 1978
Amendment to Title XIV – 1981
The Agriculture and Food Act of 1981
Amendment to Title XIV of Food Security Act – 1985
Improving America's Schools Act of 1994—extended land-grant status to tribal colleges and universities

See also
Association of Public and Land-grant Universities
List of land-grant universities
Manual labor college
State university

References

External links

 Where the land came from, including maps showing individual parcels.
 Gruen, J. Philip , "The Land-Grant Campus", SAH Archipedia, eds. Gabrielle Esperdy and Karen Kingsley, Charlottesville: UVaP, 2012—, architecture and land use 

 
Universities and colleges in the United States
History of universities and colleges in the United States
Public universities and colleges in the United States
Types of university or college